Lamine Abderrahman Khene (6 March 1931 – 14 December 2020), was an Algerian nationalist politician and officer.

Life
At age 16, he joined the Parti du peuple algérien (PPA) and its successor organization MTLD. Later, he joined the Front de libération nationale (FLN), to become an officer in its military wing, the Armée de libération nationale (ALN) during the Algerian War of Independence (1954–61), in which he fought as a guerrilla soldier from 1955. A medical student, in 1956, he was one of the co-founders of the Union générale des étudiants musulmans algériens (UGEMA), the FLN's student organization which later became the national student organization of Algeria.

He served as a secretary of state in the first lineup of the provisional exile government of the FLN, the Gouvernement Provisoire de la République Algérienne (GPRA) between 1958 and 1960.

References

External links
 Interview with Lamine Khene in El Watan (2004, French).

Algerian rebels
1931 births
2020 deaths
Algerian People's Party politicians
Movement for the Triumph of Democratic Liberties politicians
National Liberation Front (Algeria) politicians
Algerian exiles
21st-century Algerian people